Christos "Chris" Saloustros (Greek: Χρήστος Σαλούστρος; born March 29, 1990) is a Greek professional basketball player for PAOK of the Greek Basket League. He is a 2.02 m (6 ft 7  in) tall small forward.

Professional career
Saloustros played with the youth teams of Filathlitikos, and then with the senior men's team of Filathlitikos, in the Greek lower minor league divisions. He played with Filathlitikos in the Greek 4th Division, in the 2010–11 season, and in the Greek 3rd Division, in the 2011–12 season. Saloustros then started his pro career with Filathlitikos, in the Greek 2nd Division, in the 2012–13 season. He then moved to the top-tier level Greek League club Panionios, where he also played in the EuroCup. He joined the Greek EuroCup club PAOK, in 2014.

In 2015, he moved to the Greek club Kolossos Rodou. After two years, he left the club, and on June 10, 2017, he joined Promitheas Patras of the Greek Basket League. He was named the Greek League's Most Improved Player in 2018. 

Saloustros joined the Greek Basket League and BCL club Peristeri in 2019. On July 2, 2020, he officially re-upped his contract with Peristeri. On July 29, 2021, Saloustros renewed for a third season with the club and was subsequently named team captain. During the 2021-22 campaign, in a total of 22 games, he averaged 5.2 points and 3.3 rebounds, playing around 16 minutes per contest. On July 14, 2022, Saloustros parted ways with Peristeri.

On August 24, 2022, Saloustros returned to PAOK after seven years for a second stint.

National team career
Saloustros became a member of the senior men's Greek national basketball team in 2017. He played at the 2019 FIBA World Cup qualification.

References

External links
EuroCup Profile
FIBA Champions League Profile
Draftexpress.com Profile
Eurobasket.com Profile
Greek Basket League Profile 
Greek Basket League Profile 

1990 births
Living people
EFAO Zografou B.C. players
Greek men's basketball players
Kolossos Rodou B.C. players
Panionios B.C. players
P.A.O.K. BC players
Peristeri B.C. players
Promitheas Patras B.C. players
Small forwards
Sportspeople from Heraklion